The Ministry of Sarat Chandra Sinha was formed on 31 January 1972. The ministry was dissolved on 12 March 1978.

Cabinet Ministers

References 

Assam ministries
Indian National Congress state ministries
Cabinets established in 1972
1972 in Indian politics